José Salah (born 1 August 1920) was a Chilean water polo player. He competed in the men's tournament at the 1948 Summer Olympics.

References

External links
 

1920 births
Possibly living people
Chilean male water polo players
Olympic water polo players of Chile
Water polo players at the 1948 Summer Olympics
Sportspeople from Santiago